Moses ben Isaac Edrehi (–) Moroccan-born cabalist and teacher of modern and Oriental languages. He resided mainly in Amsterdam and in England.

Biography
Moses Edrehi was born to a Moroccan Jewish family in Agadir. At an early age, when the Jews were expelled from that city, his family relocated to Mogador, and after 1784 to Rabat. At the age of fourteen he began preaching in the city of Meknes.

He arrived in London in 1791, studying there at the Sephardi beth midrash Etz Ḥayyim. He also lived for some time in Amsterdam. Edrehi eventually left for the Land of Israel, via France, Italy, Malta, and Turkey. 

Edrehi was a firm believer in the existence somewhere in western Asia of the Ten Lost Tribes, and was known for his eccentric character and manner of speech. In June 1829 there appeared in Blackwood's Magazine one of Christopher North's Noctes Ambrosianae, devoted in large measure to his peculiarities.

Bibliography
 
 
  (English translation published in London, 1834.)

References
 

18th-century Moroccan Jews
19th-century Moroccan Jews
British people of Moroccan-Jewish descent
English Jewish writers
Kabbalists
People from Agadir